Jerzy Feliks Zabielski (28 March 1897 – 19 November 1958) was a Polish fencer. He won a bronze medal in the team sabre competition at the 1928 Summer Olympics.

He took part in the Polish-Soviet War. After the war Zabielski studied law at the Jagiellonian University in Kraków. In 1935 he was promoted to the rank of captain. He fought in the September Campaign of World War II, eventually fighting in the Polish Armed Forces in the West. After the war he stayed in the United Kingdom and returned to Poland in 1958.

References

External links
 

1897 births
1958 deaths
Jagiellonian University alumni
Polish male fencers
Olympic fencers of Poland
Fencers at the 1924 Summer Olympics
Fencers at the 1928 Summer Olympics
Olympic bronze medalists for Poland
Fencers from Warsaw
People from Warsaw Governorate
Polish people of the Polish–Soviet War
Polish military personnel of World War II
Olympic medalists in fencing
Medalists at the 1928 Summer Olympics